Neolloydia is a formerly recognized genus of cacti. The genus was first erected by Britton and Rose in 1922. Edward F. Anderson regarded Neolloydia as being poorly defined, with the result that species that had at times been included in Neolloydia were afterwards placed in multiple genera, including Coryphantha, Echinomastus, Escobaria, Mammillaria, Sclerocactus, Thelocactus and Turbinicarpus. In his 2001 book, Anderson firmly placed only one species in the genus, Neolloydia conoidea, with another, Neolloydia matehualensis, being regarded as only a variant of N. conoidea. , Plants of the World Online treated Neolloydia conoidea as a synonym of Cochemiea conoidea, and Neolloydia as a synonym of Cochemiea.

Species that have been placed in Neolloydia include:
Neolloydia clavata → Coryphantha clavata
Neolloydia conoidea → Cochemiea conoidea
Neolloydia horripila  → Kadenicarpus horripilus
Neolloydia johnsonii  → Echinomastus johnsonii
Neolloydia laui  → Turbinicarpus laui
Neolloydia lophophoroides → Turbinicarpus lophophoroides
Neolloydia macdowellii → Thelocactus macdowellii
Neolloydia mandragora → Rapicactus mandragora
Neolloydia mariposensis → Echinomastus mariposensis
Neolloydia odorata → Cumarinia odorata
Neolloydia pilispina → Mammillaria pilispina
Neolloydia roseana → Acharagma roseanum
Neolloydia Neolloydia subterranea → Rapicactus subterraneus
Neolloydia texensis → Cochemiea conoidea
Neolloydia zaragosae → Rapicactus zaragosae

References

Historically recognized angiosperm genera
Cacti